Bader Al-Khames (born 4 August 1984) is a Saudi Arabian football player who plays as a striker.

International Goals

References

1984 births
Living people
Saudi Arabian footballers
People from Dammam
Al-Taawoun FC players
Ettifaq FC players
Sdoos Club players
Al-Ahli Saudi FC players
Al-Fateh SC players
Al-Nahda Club (Saudi Arabia) players
Al-Shoulla FC players
Al-Thoqbah Club players
Al-Arabi SC (Saudi Arabia) players
Saudi First Division League players
Saudi Fourth Division players
Saudi Professional League players
Saudi Second Division players
Association football forwards
Saudi Arabian Shia Muslims